Orsa or ORSA  may refer to:

Places:
 Orsha or Orša, Belarus
 Orsa, Sweden
 Orsa Municipality, Swedish municipality

Vessels:
 Orsa-class torpedo boat, built for the Italian Navy in the 1930s
 Italian training ship Orsa Maggiore (A5323), a contemporary ocean ketch serving as a sail training vessel

Other uses:
 Orsa (moth), a moth in the family Erebidae
 Operations Research Society of America
 Own Risk and Solvency Assessment, in EU insurance regulation
 Oxacillin-resistant Staphylococcus aureus